Joseph Buckland (born 27 October 1992) is an English ice dancer. With former partner Olivia Smart, he is a three-time British national junior champion (2012–14) and competed at three World Junior Championships, reaching the top ten in 2014.

Personal life 
Joseph Buckland was born in Nottingham, England. He is the younger brother of Nicholas Buckland, who also competes in ice dancing.

Career

Early years
Buckland teamed up with his first partner, Georgia Robinson, at age 15. In 2008, he was diagnosed with two stress fractures in his spine, keeping him off the ice for six months. He skated with Danielle Bennett in the 2009–10 season. The two placed 15th at their sole ISU Junior Grand Prix event, in Turkey, and became the British national silver medalists on the junior level.

Partnership with Smart
Buckland began skating with Olivia Smart in 2010. They made their JGP debut in autumn 2011, ranking 13th in Austria and 12th in Estonia. They came in 17th at their first World Junior Championships, held in Minsk in March 2012. In the 2012–13 season, the duo missed the JGP series and finished 22nd at the 2013 World Junior Championships in Milan.

In 2013–14, Smart/Buckland placed seventh at both of their JGP assignments, Poland and the Czech Republic, and finished 10th at the 2014 World Junior Championships in Sofia, Bulgaria.

Smart/Buckland moved up to the senior level in the 2014–15 season. In October 2014, they placed fourth at the Ondrej Nepela Trophy, an ISU Challenger Series event. In November, they won silver medals at the International Cup of Nice and NRW Trophy before taking the British national title in the absence of Penny Coomes / Nicholas Buckland. Smart/Buckland withdrew from the 2015 European Championships before the short dance, Buckland having fallen ill with gastroenteritis. The duo then went on to place 27th at the 2015 World Championships in Shanghai, China. They split in June 2015.

Later partnerships
Buckland teamed up with Molly Lanaghan in October 2015. As of October 2016, his skating partner is Robynne Tweedale.

Programs

With Tweedale

With Smart

Competitive highlights 
CS: Challenger Series; JGP: Junior Grand Prix

With Tweedale

With Smart

With Bennett

References

External links 

 
 
 

English male ice dancers
1992 births
Living people
Sportspeople from Nottingham